Pinar Toprak  (born 18 October 1980) is a Turkish-American Emmy-nominated composer, conductor and performer, who specialises in creating thematic scores for everything from superhero sagas and blockbuster comedies to TV series and dramas. With her work on Captain Marvel (2019) and Fortnite, Pinar is the first female composer to score both a film and video game with gross revenues of over $1 billion and $5 billion respectively. 

Pinar also brings her fresh perspective and unique vision to a diversity of others musical projects, to name a few: composing the new theme for Amazon Prime Video Sports, popularly used on NFL´s Thursday Night Football, composing and producing the soundtrack for Disney theme parks, including the new Epcot theme, writing and producing music for Christina Aguilera’s 2019 Xperience live show in Las Vegas and conducting Billie Eilish's performance of “No Time To Die” at the 2022 Oscars ceremony.

As the recipient of an ASCAP Shirley Walker Award and three International Film Music Critics Association Awards for Best Original Score, Pinar’s dynamic style has attracted accolades across genres and earned her an Emmy nomination for Best Original Score as well as a spot on the Academy Awards shortlist.

Pinar’s talent for illuminating a story with her music is evident throughout her work, including scores for The Lost City (Starring Sandra Bullock and Channing Tatum, directed by Adam Nee and Aaron Nee), Stargirl on the CW (Created by Geoff Johns and Greg Berlanti ), Syfy’s Krypton (Created by David S. Goyer and Damien Kindler), HBO’s McMillions (directed by James Lee Hernandez and Brian Lazarte), Slumberland (Starring Jason Momoa, directed by Francis Lawrence) and the upcoming film Shotgun Wedding (Starring Jennifer Lopez, directed by Jason Moore), among many others.

Early life 
Toprak grew up in the "not-fancy part" of Istanbul, Turkey. Her father was an accountant but a lover of the arts. He played violin and starred in stage productions as a young man; when peers from his theater company became popular actors on local TV, he did their books. He nudged Toprak's interest in music and her love of movies. Pretending not to have his glasses handy, he would ask her to read the synopsis and cast for films listed in the newspaper's TV schedule. He also introduced her to American westerns and, crucially, Superman. She memorized the dialogue from the 1978 film starring Christopher Reeve, dubbed into Turkish—and she loved John Williams's score so much that she recorded the soaring, songlike music from the TV to her Walkman so she could listen to it anytime.

"Encouraged by her father, Toprak enrolled in the local music conservatory when she was five. She began as a violinist but hated the instrument and switched to guitar."

According to Toprak, she was always drawn to superheroes and comic books growing up. She often felt like the "weird kid out" growing up as a young girl in Turkey, and books gave her an escape to another world that was not her world at all.

Toprak shared a small room with her brother, Jesse Toprak. Her mother, whom the composer characterizes as a quiet homemaker, was so inspired by her headstrong musical daughter that in her 40s, she took up the Turkish stringed oud, which she regularly plays in concerts today. Toprak found refuge in her piano. Music became "the way I was able to express all the things that I was feeling", she says. "I tell my kids that music was my best friend my whole life."

She finished high school at 16, and after her 17th birthday she took the leap to the United States. "She lived with her brother in Wisconsin and taught herself English mostly through conversation, then completed a short ESL program before enrolling at Berklee. Soon after moving to the United States, she realized a career as a jazz guitarist wasn't in the cards and briefly switched to piano."

Toprak graduated from Berklee at 19, thanks to testing out of several classes and taking general courses at a local college. She became a US citizen in 2015.

Education 
Toprak received her musical training in her hometown of Istanbul, while attending the Istanbul State Conservatory, the oldest conservatory in Turkey. During her studies there, she focused on composition and multi-instrumentalism.

She then moved to the United States, where she went to Chicago and then to the Berklee College of Music in Boston to study jazz. At Berklee, she was initially a piano performance major, but then pursued film scoring. She received her Bachelor of Music in Film Scoring from Berklee in 2000 when she was 19 years old.

After Berklee and following her move to Los Angeles, she attended and received her master's degree in Classical Composition from the California State University, Northridge in 2002. It was at CSUN where she was recommended for an internship at Paramount Pictures at the age of 20.

Later in her career, Toprak also instructed Berklee students in Film Scoring as a part of Berklee Online classes.

Career 
At the age of 20, Toprak got her first job, an internship at the Music Department of Paramount Pictures, where she attended scoring sessions almost every day. In her own words, this was her first step towards reaching her goal of working for Hans Zimmer, since the experience at Paramount made her feel ready to reach out to him. This method proved to be successful, as she ended up working for Hans Zimmer at his music production company, Media Ventures International (now Remote Control). As required by her job and based on her own interest, she trained herself in programming sample instruments. She left Zimmer's company after a year as she was hired as the composer's assistant to the composer and orchestrator, William Ross.

Her big break as a composer came in 2006 when she composed the score for the video game, Ninety-Nine Nights, when she was also pregnant with her first child. After that, she landed another scoring project for the video game, Behind Enemy Lines 2. Since then, she has worked on more than 40 feature films and several video game and television projects, as well as the fanfare of Skydance Media from 2010 to 2022. Among them was the romantic comedy, The Lightkeepers (2009), the score of which (by Toprak) was nominated and won the 2010 International Film Music Critics Association (IFMCA) Award for Best Comedy Score. Toprak's score for The Lightkeepers also made it to the 2011 Academy Award Shortlist for Best Original Score. Following that, Toprak composed the music to the documentary film, The Wind Gods (2011) for which she received a second IFMCA award for Best Documentary Score in 2011.

Toprak was hired by director Dean Devlin, to compose the score for the 2017 film, Geostorm. While she invested a huge amount of time and money on writing an epic orchestral score for this project, she was laid off after the production companies, Warner Bros. and Skydance Media hired a new director for the movie's reshoots. Under more than $100,000 of debt, and simultaneously, working as a single mother after her divorce, Toprak refers to this period of her life and career as a testing and difficult time.

Her resilience through these hardships came to fruition when her agent, Richard Kraft, contacted her regarding an opportunity to score the video game, Fortnite. In addition, composer Danny Elfman hired Toprak to write additional scores for the 2017 DC superhero movie, Justice League (Dir. Zack Snyder). Prior to Captain Marvel, this was Toprak's gateway to large-scale superhero movies.

Toprak received an opportunity to audition and pitch a main theme for the hit blockbuster film, Captain Marvel. Previously, she had already pitched a demo for the DC blockbuster movie, Wonder Woman (2017), but was not selected for the project. After composing the main theme for Captain Marvel, Toprak hired and conducted a full 70-piece orchestra using her own funds in order to record the theme, while additionally sending a tape regarding her idea about the movie's score. The risk of using her personal funds was worth it, as she composed the score for this hit Marvel superhero movie. Consequently, she made history as she became the first woman to ever score a major superhero movie, and the first to compose for a film that made more than $1 billion, and received a nomination for the 2019 World Soundtrack Awards. Currently, Toprak is one of the few female composers who is working on major large-scale productions.

Toprak's other notable works include the score to the 2018–2019 series, Krypton, the prequel to the well-known Superman series; DC's recent superhero television series, Stargirl, and the HBO limited series, McMillions (2020), for which she was nominated for a Primetime Emmy Award for Original Music Composition for a Documentary Series or Special. She is the first Turkish composer to be nominated for the Emmys.

In addition, Toprak's work on the 2018 movie, The Tides of Fate earned her the 2019 ASCAP Shirley Walker Award, and also, her third IFMCA Award for Best Original Score for a Documentary Film in 2019.

In contrast to her orchestral and electronic works, Toprak's score in the 2018 Pixar animated short film, Purl (Dir. Kristen Lester) shows elements of her jazz studies and composition.

In 2022, Amazon picked Toprak to compose and conduct the new theme for its Thursday Night Football telecasts. Toprak recorded the theme with at Ocean Way Studios in Nashville with an 80-piece orchestra.

Toprak's other scoring credits include the music for Christina Aguilera's 2019 Las Vegas show, Xperience, as well as Fortnite, and the main theme for Walt Disney World's Epcot theme park.

Toprak is a voting member at the World Soundtrack Academy along with composers such as Carter Burwell, Hildur Guðnadóttir, and fellow Berklee graduates, Alan Silvestri, and Ramin Djawadi.

Personal life 
Toprak currently resides in Los Angeles, and when not composing loves to sail the Pacific Coast.

Discography

Film

Television

Video games

Other work 
 Christina Aguilera: The Xperience Las Vegas Residency (2019) (residency intro)
 Skydance Media fanfare (2010 - 2022)

Awards and nominations

References

External links
Official website

1980 births
Living people
21st-century American composers
21st-century American women musicians
21st-century Turkish women musicians
21st-century women composers
American film score composers
American television composers
American women film score composers
Berklee College of Music alumni
Berklee College of Music faculty
Musicians from Istanbul
Skydance Media people
Turkish emigrants to the United States
Turkish film score composers
Video game composers
Women television composers